Matthew James Foster (born January 27, 1995) is an American professional baseball pitcher for the Chicago White Sox of Major League Baseball (MLB). He made his MLB debut in 2020.

Amateur career
Foster attended Valley High School in Valley, Alabama. He was drafted by the Arizona Diamondbacks in the 29th round of the 2013 MLB draft, but did not sign. He attended Gulf Coast State College for two years (2014-2015). He then transferred to the University of Alabama, and played for the Crimson Tide for the 2016 season. Foster was drafted by the Chicago White Sox in the 20th round of the 2016 MLB draft.

Professional career
Foster split the 2016 season between the Arizona League White Sox and the Great Falls Voyagers, going a combined 0–0 with a 0.61 ERA over  innings. He split the 2017 season between the Kannapolis Intimidators and the Winston-Salem Dash, going a combined 0–2 with a 1.30 ERA over  innings. He played for the Glendale Desert Dogs of the Arizona Fall League following the 2017 season. He split the 2018 season between Winston-Salem and the Birmingham Barons, going a combined 2–5 with a 3.30 ERA over 60 innings. He split the 2019 season between Birmingham and the Charlotte Knights, going a combined 4–1 with a 3.20 ERA over  innings.

Foster was added to the White Sox 40–man roster following the 2019 season.

On July 29, 2020, Foster was called up to the major leagues. He made his MLB debut on August 1, pitching a scoreless inning of relief and earning a win in the process. With the 2020 Chicago White Sox, Foster appeared in 23 games, compiling a 6-1 record with 2.20 ERA and 31 strikeouts in  innings pitched. Foster struggled in 2021 as he was in and out of Triple-A in that season. Foster appeared in just 37 games in the Major Leagues compiling a 2–1 record with a 6.00 ERA in 39 innings while striking out 40 batters.

References

External links

Alabama Crimson Tide bio

1995 births
Living people
People from Valley, Alabama
Baseball players from Alabama
Major League Baseball pitchers
Chicago White Sox players
Alabama Crimson Tide baseball players
Arizona League White Sox players
Great Falls Voyagers players
Kannapolis Intimidators players
Winston-Salem Dash players
Birmingham Barons players
Charlotte Knights players
Glendale Desert Dogs players